Stéfanie Tremblay (born 18 July 1990) is a Canadian judoka. Tremblay won a silver for Canada at the 2015 Pan American Games.

See also

 Judo in Canada
 List of Canadian judoka

References

External links
 

1990 births
Living people
Canadian female judoka
French Quebecers
Judoka at the 2011 Pan American Games
Judoka at the 2015 Pan American Games
Medalists at the 2011 Pan American Games
Medalists at the 2015 Pan American Games
Pan American Games bronze medalists for Canada
Pan American Games medalists in judo
Pan American Games silver medalists for Canada
Sportspeople from Saguenay, Quebec